Verticordia forrestii, commonly known as Forrest's featherflower, is a flowering plant in the myrtle family, Myrtaceae and is endemic to the north-west of Western Australia. It is a shrub with small, egg-shaped leaves and massed displays of scented pink to red flowers in spring.

Description

Flowering time is from July to November.

Taxonomy and naming
Verticordia forrestii was first formally described by Ferdinand von Mueller in 1883 and the description was published in Southern Science Record. The specific epithet (forrestii) honours Forrest, the explorer and statesman who made the type collection near the Gascoyne River in 1882.

When Alex George reviewed the genus Verticordia in 1991, he placed this species in subgenus Eperephes, section Pennuligera along with V. comosa, V. lepidophylla, V. chrysostachys, V. aereiflora, V. dichroma, V. x eurardyensis, V. muelleriana, V. argentea, V. albida, V. fragrans, V. venusta, V. serotina, V. oculata, V. etheliana and V. grandis.

Distribution and habitat
This verticordia grows in deep sand on sand dunes in open shrubland. It occurs between Carnarvon and Onslow near the coast, inland as far as Ashburton Downs and Wiluna, south-east to the Kennedy Range and almost to the Wooramel River, in the Carnarvon, Gascoyne, Murchison and Pilbara biogeographic regions. An early collection was made further northeast, at Roebourne, although it has not been found since then.

Ecology
The flowers of V. forrestii are often visited by small bees, (Euryhesma forrestii) from the Family Colletidae.

Conservation
Verticordia forrestii is classified as "not threatened" by the Western Australian Government Department of Parks and Wildlife.

Use in horticulture
It is best suited to warmer climates. The flowers first appear during November, continuing until April, opening together and nearly covering the leaves and branches. It has been propagated from both cuttings and seed and grows best in sandy soil in a sunny position.

References

forrestii
Rosids of Western Australia
Eudicots of Western Australia
Plants described in 1883
Taxa named by Ferdinand von Mueller